Davorin "Darko" F. Ribnikar (16 May 1878 – 31 August 1914) was the editor-in-chief of the Serbian newspaper Politika and the brother of its founder Vladislav F. Ribnikar.

Biography
Ribnikar was the youngest son of Slovene physician from Carniola, Franc Ribnikar. He had two brothers Vladislav and Slobodan. He was educated in Svilajnac and Belgrade. He graduated in law in Germany, in Berlin and in Jena. After the death of his father, in 1905, he returned to Belgrade to assist his brother Vladislav with Politika. 

Ribnikar became editor in chief for the newspaper but also served as special correspondent in Romania during the Peasant revolt of 1907 and during the Friedjung process in Vienna in 1909.

As a reserve officer of the Serbian army Ribnikar participated in both Balkan Wars, like his brother he was twice severely wounded. During the Austro-Hungarian invasion of Serbia on 31 August 1914 Ribnikar was killed in action by an enemy shell. The trench in which he was killed was photo documented by Andra Popović in his War album 1914-1918.

References 

1878 births
1914 deaths
People from Svilajnac
Royal Serbian Army soldiers
Serbian journalists
Serbian people of Slovenian descent
Serbian military personnel of the Balkan Wars
Serbian military personnel of World War I
Serbian military personnel killed in World War I
Burials at Serbian Orthodox monasteries and churches
Writers from the Kingdom of Serbia